NGC 1994 (also known as ESO 56-SC136) is an open cluster in the Dorado constellation which is located in the Large Magellanic Cloud. It was discovered by John Herschel on 16 December 1835. It has an apparent magnitude of 9.8 and its size is 0.60 arc minutes.

References

Open clusters
1994
56-SC136
Dorado (constellation)
Large Magellanic Cloud
Astronomical objects discovered in 1835
Discoveries by John Herschel